Mechercharimyces mesophilus  is a Gram-positive bacterium from the genus of Mechercharimyces which has been isolated from sediments from the Jellyfish Lake in Palau.

References

Further reading

External links
Type strain of Mechercharimyces mesophilus at BacDive -  the Bacterial Diversity Metadatabase	

Bacillales
Bacteria described in 2006